Livefields is a live album by the band Toto. It was recorded during the reunion tour after the release of their album Mindfields, and released in late 1999. Outside the US, the album contained a second CD with 3 extra tracks, recorded during several concerts in France, as well as two video clips for "Melanie" and "Cruel."

Track listing

Regular album
 "Caught in the Balance" (Lukather, Paich, Phillips, Porcaro, Lynch, Kimball)
 "Tale of a Man" (Paich)
 "Rosanna" (Paich)
 "[Luke Solo]" (Lukather)
 "Million Miles Away"  (Paich)
 "Jake to the Bone" (Paich, Porcaro, Porcaro, Lukather)
 "[Simon Solo]" (Phillips)
 "Dave's Gone Skiing" (Lukather, Porcaro, Phillips)
 "Out of Love" (Lukather, Byron)
 "Mama" (Paich, Kimball)
 "You Are the Flower" (Kimball)
 "The Road Goes On" (Lukather, Paich, Ballard)
 "Better World" (Lukather, Paich, Phillips)
 "Girl Goodbye" (Paich)
 "[Dave Solo]" (Paich)
 "White Sister" (Paich, Kimball)

Note: Tracks 9-12 are part of a special acoustic set.

Bonus disc
 "I Will Remember" (Lukather, Lynch)
 "Hold the Line" (Paich)
 "I Won't Hold You Back" (Lukather)
 "Child's Anthem" (Paich)
 "Melanie" (music video)
 "Cruel" (live video)

Note: The song "Child's Anthem" was only available as a Japanese bonus track.

Personnel

 Bobby Kimball – vocals
 Steve Lukather – guitars, vocals
 David Paich – keyboards, vocals
 Mike Porcaro – bass
 Simon Phillips – drums
 Tony Spinner – backing vocals, guitar
 Buddy Hyatt – backing vocals, percussion
 John Jessel – backing vocals, keyboards

References

Toto (band) albums
1999 live albums
Columbia Records live albums
Live neo-progressive rock albums